Alpha is a neighborhood of Beavercreek, in Greene County, Ohio, in the United States.  It is located on the eastern side of the Dayton metropolitan area.  A post office is located in Alpha, with the ZIP code of 45301.

A post office called Alpha has been in operation since 1850. The community is one of the oldest in the area.

It was the location of a Pittsburgh, Cincinnati, Chicago and St. Louis Railroad railway station stop, of a railway that has been shut down and turned into a bike path.

Alpha has also been known in the past as Harbine or Harbines.

References

Neighborhoods in Ohio
Geography of Greene County, Ohio
Beavercreek, Ohio
Populated places established in 1850
1850 establishments in Ohio